Scythris picaepennis is a moth of the family Scythrididae first described by the German entomologist Gottlieb August Wilhelm Herrich-Schäffer in 1855. It is found in Europe.

Description
The moth has a wingspan of circa 10 mm. The forewings are rather short-pointed, shining dark bronzy. Hindwings nearly 1, cilia less than 2 ; dark purplish -fuscous ; 4 and 5 connate or stalked Abdomen in female beneath with an ochreous- whitish suffusion on anteapical segment.

The moth flies during the day from June to September. The larvae form a loose spinning near the base of its food plant, rock-rose (Helianthemum species), eating the upper surface of the lower leaves.

References

crassiuscula
Moths of Europe
Moths described in 1855
Taxa named by Gottlieb August Wilhelm Herrich-Schäffer